The 2020–21 U.S. Salernitana 1919 season was the club's 101st season in existence. During this season, the club competed in the Serie B and the Coppa Italia.

After several seasons at the Serie B level, Salernitana won promotion to Serie A at the end of the season under the tenure of head coach Fabrizio Castori.

Current squad

Other players under contract

Out on loan

Transfers

In

Out

Competitions

Club Friendlies

Serie B

Results summary

Results By Round

Matches

Copa Italia

References

1. *Betexplorer
2. *Soccerway
3. *Worldfootball

External links